The LOS40 Music Award for Best Latin New Artist is an honor presented annually since 2020 by Los 40 as part of the LOS40 Music Awards, which are considered Spain's most important music awards today.

Winners and nominees

References

Los Premios 40 Principales
Awards established in 2020
Spanish music awards